Gedeon Brolnitskyj (Polish: Gedeon Brolnicki, 1528 - 1618) was a bishop of the Ruthenian Uniate Church and a monk belonged to the Lauryshava Monastery and since 1601  Archbishop of Polotsk.

Biography

In 1596 Brolnitskyj was an Orthodox Archimandrite of the Lauryshava Monastery (in today's Belarus) and converted from Orthodoxy to Greek Catholicism, signing an act of the Union of Brest.

On May 26, 1601 Gideon Brolicki was nominated Archbishop of Polotsk. On August 6, 1601, he was ordained bishop and remained as Catholic Uniate bishop till his death in 1618.

References

External links
 http://www.catholic-hierarchy.org/bishop/bbroln.html

1528 births
1618 deaths
Archimandrites
People from Polotsk
Converts to Eastern Catholicism from Eastern Orthodoxy
Former Belarusian Orthodox Christians
Uniate archbishops of Polotsk
16th-century Eastern Orthodox bishops